Michael Burlingame is a New York City filmmaker. His 1986 surrealist film To a Random featured legendary wrestler Walter "Killer" Kowalski in a comic role and an original soundtrack by Birdsongs of the Mesozoic. His work in music video includes the Big Brother and the Holding Company documentary Nine Hundred Nights, as well as projects with Paul McCartney, Sting, and Robert Plant. Burlingame's independent films have been featured in many international film festivals, including the London Film Festival, the Brussels International Festival of Film and Video, the Chicago International Film Festival, the Big Apple Film Festival, and the Krakow
International Festival of Short Films. They have also screened at museums such as the Los Angeles County
Museum of Art, the American Museum of the Moving Image, the Institute of Contemporary Art (Boston), and the Museum of Fine
Arts (Boston).

Music projects include the Janis Joplin documentary Nine Hundred
Nights, as well as films/videos with Paul McCartney, Bob Dylan, and
others. He received an Emmy nomination for his work with Sting.

As editor, his work includes documentaries on Ernest Hemingway, Charles
Darwin, Bertrand Russell, William Butler Yeats, Igor Stravinsky, and
Alfred Hitchcock.

External links
 
 Birdsongs of the Mesozoic: Lost in the B-Zone
 Big Brother and the Holding Company: Nine Hundred Nights (excerpt)

American film directors
American music video directors
Living people
Year of birth missing (living people)